Angeliki Antoniou (born 12 July 1956) is a Greek film director, screenwriter and producer. She studied architecture in Greece and film direction at the German Film and Television Academy in Berlin. She works as scriptwriter and director in Greece and in Germany. In 2006 she taught film direction at the Film School of University in Thessaloniki. She lives in Athens and Berlin. She has directed feature films and documentaries which have been screened and awarded in prestigious international festivals (Locarno, Berlinale, Göteborg, Montreal, Palm Springs, Moscow, Thessaloniki etc)   and distributed world-wide. 

Her critically acclaimed feature film Eduart based upon  true events,  participated in more than 40 film festivals, including the 29th Moscow International Film Festival, and has received 18 awards in Greece, France, the US and the UK..Eduart  was selected by the EFA for the 2007 European Film Awards and it was Greece's submission for Best Foreign Film 2008.

Filmography (selection)

Director and screenwriter 
Persephone (1987)
Gefangene des Meeres ("Prisoners of the Sea") (1989)
Donusa (1992)
Tänze der Nacht ("Dances of the Night") (1996)
Verspielte Nächte ("Nights, Gambled Away") (1997)
Heimlicher Tanz ("Secret Dance") (1999)
Allein unter Männern ("Alone Among Men") (2000)
Messerscharf ("Sharp Like a Knife") (2001)
Eduart (2006)
The Unknown Athenians (2020)
Green Sea (2020)

Screenwriter 
Das Glück sei Unbeweglichkeit (1990)

Producer 

Eduart (2006)
The Unknown Athenians (2020)
Green Sea (2020)

Awards and Nominations (selection) 

 1992: Nominated for Pardo d’ Oro (Golden Leopard) at the Locarno International Film Festival for Donusa
 Youth Jury Award for Best Film (A' Prix de la Jeunesse)  for  Donusa
 1992: Nominated for the Golden Alexander at the Thessaloniki International Film Festival for Donusa
 1997: Nominated     for the Golden Alexander at the Thessaloniki International Film festival  for Verspielte Nächte(Nights Gambled Away)
 1997: Greek Film Awards for Best Film & Best  Director (Angeliki Antoniou) & Best Screenplay (Angeliki Antoniou and Kriton Kalaitzidis)                   & for Best   Actress (Jasmin Tabatabai) for Verspielte Nächte (Nights Gambled Away)
 1997: Award for Best Set Design at Hof International Film Festival for Verspielte Nächte     
 2006: Winner of  9 Greek State Film Awards,  at the Thessaloniki International Film Festival among them for Best Film & Best Director                      & Best Screenplay (Angeliki Antoniou)
 FIPRESCI Award at the Thessaloniki International Film Festival for Best Greek Film for Eduart
 2007: Selected by the European Film Academy for the 2007 European Film Awards, Eduart
 2007: Golden Antigone Award (Antigone d'or de la Ville et de l'Agglomération de Montpellier) at the  Montpellier International Mediterranean         Film Festival & Special mention by the Young People's Award (CMCAS)  for Eduart
 2007: Nominated for the Competitive Section, “Europe-Europe” at the Sevilla International Film Festival, for Eduart

 2007: Nominated for the Golden St. George at the Moscow International Film Festival, for Eduart
 2007: Nominated for Grand  Prize at the Tallinn Black Nights Film Festival, for Eduart
 2008: Special Recognition for Best Ensemble Cast at The Method Fest Film Festival,  for Eduart
 Greece's submission for an Oscar Nomination for Best  Foreign Film 2008 for Eduart
 2020: Nominated for the Golden Alexander (International Competition) at the Thessaloniki Documentary  Festival, for The Unknown Athenians
 2020:  Audience  Award at the Kitzbühel Film Festival for Green Sea
 2021:  Award for Best Greek Documentary at the AegeanDocs International Documentary Film Festival for The Unknown Athenians
 2021: Efebo d’Oro «Ande» Cinema Donna Award at the  Efebo d’Oro (International Competition) for Green Sea
 2021: Hellenic Film Academy Award for Best Documentary for The Unknown Athenians

References

Web links
 
 Director's bio on official website

1956 births
Greek film directors
Greek women film directors
Greek screenwriters
Living people
Film people from Athens